Fleeson is a surname. Notable people with the surname include:

 Doris Fleeson (1901–1970), American journalist
 William Fleeson, American psychologist